Pachybrachis bivittatus is a species of case-bearing leaf beetle in the family Chrysomelidae. It is found in Central America and North America.

References

Further reading

External links

 

bivittatus
Articles created by Qbugbot
Beetles described in 1758
Taxa named by Carl Linnaeus